Brigden Ranch is a neighborhood in northeast Pasadena, California and unincorporated Los Angeles County, California. The Bridgen Ranch Neighborhood Association defines the borders of Bridgen Ranch as Galbreth Road on the north (including Westlyn Place and Eastlyn Place), Casa Grande Street on the south, North Allen Avenue on the west, and Martelo Avenue on the east.

Landmarks
All of the commercial development in the neighborhood is on Allen Avenue. Brigden Ranch has no park.

Education
Brigden Ranch is served by Webster Elementary School, Eliot Middle School, Marshall Fundamental Secondary School, and Pasadena High School.

Transportation
Brigden Ranch is served by Metro Local lines 256 and 686.

References

Neighborhoods in Pasadena, California